Maya Simantov is an Israeli singer and songwriter who has worked in the house music scene for over a decade. She is mostly known for her collaborations with DJ and producer Offer Nissim, such as "Everybody Needs a Man", "Let Me Live", "Alone", "Be My Boyfriend", "First Time" and more, and has written songs for recording artists such as Dana International, Rita and Sarit Hadad.

Biography 
She has collaborated with Peter Rauhofer, Tracy Young, DJ Skazi, Itay Kalderon (part of the duo "JetFire"), and Henree. Her most popular hit is "Take the World" was produced by Yinon Yahel.

Discography
 First Time (2005)
 Second Time (2006)
 Over You (2010)

References

1982 births
Israeli people of Mountain Jewish descent
21st-century Israeli women singers
Israeli pop singers
English-language singers from Israel
People from Tel Aviv
Women in electronic music
The X Factor contestants
Living people